The 2008–09 Elite Women's Hockey League season was the fifth season of the Elite Women's Hockey League (EWHL), a multi-national women's ice hockey league. HC Slavia Praha of the Czech Republic won the league title for the second consecutive season before announcing its withdrawal from following year's competition for financial reasons.

Final standings

References

Women
European Women's Hockey League seasons
Euro